Brandon Joseph (born February 5, 2001) is an American football safety for the Notre Dame Fighting Irish. He previously played for the Northwestern Wildcats.

Early life and high school career
Joseph grew up in College Station, Texas and attended College Station High School. He was named Class 5A All-State as a senior after recording 95 tackles with 10 passes broken up and five interceptions. Joseph initially committed to play college football at Texas Tech, but ultimately decommitted to sign with Northwestern.

College career

Northwestern 
Joseph redshirted his true freshman season. As a redshirt freshman, Joseph was named first team All-Big Ten Conference and the conference Freshman of the Year. He was rated the nation's best strong safety by Pro Football Focus.

Notre Dame 
For the 2022 season, Joseph transferred to Notre Dame.

Statistics

References

External links
Notre Dame Fighting Irish bio
Northwestern Wildcats bio

Living people
Northwestern Wildcats football players
Notre Dame Fighting Irish football players
People from College Station, Texas
Players of American football from Texas
American football safeties
All-American college football players
2001 births